The Mariveleño dialect may refer to:
The dialect of Tagalog spoken in Mariveles in the Philippines
The Mariveleño language